John Monier Bickersteth  (6 September 1921 – 29 January 2018) was an English Anglican clergyman who served as the Bishop of Bath and Wells from 1975 to 1986, and Clerk of the Closet from 1979 to 1989.

Bickersteth descended from a clerical family over several generations; in total six family members have been Church of England Bishops. His father was the Rev. Canon Edward Monier Bickersteth , and his mother, Inez Katharine Jelf Bickersteth, was a friend of the actress Sybil Thorndike. His uncle was Julian Bickersteth and his great-great-grandfather was Charles James Blomfield.

Educated at Rugby School and Christ Church, Oxford, he trained for ordination at Wells Theological College and was ordained deacon in 1950 and priest in 1951. He began his career with a curacy at St Matthew Moorfields Bristol (1950-54). He was then Incumbent of St John the Evangelist, Hurst Green, Oxted (1954-62). After a spell as Vicar of St Stephen's Church, Chatham he ascended to the Episcopate in 1970 as Suffragan Bishop of Warrington, and after five years was further promoted to Bath. From 1979 he was Clerk of the Closet for a decade. 

Bickersteth died in January 2018 at the age of 96.

Bibliography

References

External links 
 Imperial War Museum Interview from 1986

1921 births
2018 deaths
20th-century Church of England bishops
Alumni of Christ Church, Oxford
Bishops of Bath and Wells
Bishops of Warrington
Clerks of the Closet
Knights Commander of the Royal Victorian Order
People educated at Rugby School
People from Canterbury
John